is a Japanese former wrestler who competed in the 1984 Summer Olympics and in the 1988 Summer Olympics.

References

External links
 

1960 births
Living people
Olympic wrestlers of Japan
Wrestlers at the 1984 Summer Olympics
Wrestlers at the 1988 Summer Olympics
Japanese male sport wrestlers
Olympic bronze medalists for Japan
Olympic medalists in wrestling
Asian Games medalists in wrestling
Wrestlers at the 1986 Asian Games
Medalists at the 1984 Summer Olympics
Asian Games bronze medalists for Japan
Medalists at the 1986 Asian Games
People from Matsusaka, Mie
Sportspeople from Mie Prefecture
20th-century Japanese people
21st-century Japanese people